Guerrero-Lasprilla v. Barr, 589 U.S. ___ (2020), was a United States Supreme Court case, the question before the Court was “Is a request for equitable tolling, as it applies to statutory motions to reopen, judicially reviewable as a question of law?“

Decision

In a 7–2 decision written by Justice Breyer, the court ruled that the request for equitable tolling was judicially reviewable as a question of law, the court vacated and remanded the case.

Dissent

References

External links
 

2020 in United States case law
United States Supreme Court cases
United States Supreme Court cases of the Roberts Court